The 2019 Belarusian Premier League was the 29th season of top-tier football in Belarus. BATE Borisov were the defending champions, having won their 13th consecutive league title and 15th overall last year. Dynamo Brest won the Belarusian Premier League title for the first time, ending the BATE Borisov streak.

Teams

The bottom two teams from the 2018 season (Smolevichi and Dnepr Mogilev) were relegated to the 2019 Belarusian First League. They were replaced by Slavia Mozyr and Energetik-BGU, champions and runners-up of the 2018 Belarusian First League respectively. 

In spring 2019, Luch Minsk merged with Dnepr Mogilev. The united club was named Dnyapro Mogilev. It inherited Luch's Premier League spot and licence, their sponsorships and most of the squad, while keeping only a few of Dnepr players and relocating to Mogilev. Dnepr continued its participation in youth tournaments independently from Luch.

Source:

League table

Results
Each team plays home-and-away once against every other team for a total of 30 matches played each.

1 The opponents of Torpedo Minsk awarded a 3–0 w/o win.

Relegation play-offs
The 14th-place finisher of this season (Dnyapro Mogilev) played a two-legged relegation play-off against the third team of the 2019 Belarusian First League (Rukh Brest) for one spot in the 2020 Premier League. Rukh Brest won the series on penalties and got promoted, while Dnyapro Mogilev were relegated.

Top goalscorers
Updated to games played on 1 December 2019 Source: football.by

References

External links
 

2019
Belarus
Belarus
1